Pili multigemini, also known as "compound hairs," is a malformation characterized by the presence of bifurcated or multiple divided hair matrices and papillae, giving rise to the formation of multiple hair shafts within the individual follicles.

Description 

The name describes a condition where several separate hair fibers bunch together and emerge from the skin through a single hair canal. Pathology shows that deep in the skin several dermal papilla are closely situated with each producing a fiber, but these separate hair follicle bulbs combine into one hair canal towards the skin surface. Folliculitis can sometimes be associated with this condition.

Treatment 
Electrolysis will permanently remove pili multigemini.
Depilating laser treatment has been suggested to improve symptomatic pili multigemini.

See also 
 Pili bifurcati
 List of cutaneous conditions

References

External links 

Conditions of the skin appendages